The Division of Cunningham is an Australian electoral division in the state of New South Wales.

History

The division was created in 1949 and is named for Allan Cunningham, a 19th-century explorer of New South Wales and Queensland.

The division has always been represented by the Australian Labor Party, except following the 2002 by-election when the Greens won the seat; being the first time that the Greens held a seat in the House of Representatives. Labor recovered the seat at the 2004 federal election. 

Its most prominent members have been Rex Connor, a senior minister in the Whitlam government, and Stephen Martin, who was Speaker of the Australian House of Representatives from 1993–1996, during the last term of the Keating government. The sitting member, since the 2022 federal election, is Alison Byrnes, a member of the Australian Labor Party.

Boundaries
Since 1984, federal electoral division boundaries in Australia have been determined at redistributions by a redistribution committee appointed by the Australian Electoral Commission. Redistributions occur for the boundaries of divisions in a particular state, and they occur every seven years, or sooner if a state's representation entitlement changes or when divisions of a state are malapportioned.

The division is located on the coast of New South Wales between southern Sydney and Wollongong.  It takes in the northern portion of Wollongong, including Corrimal, Figtree and Unanderra. It also includes several of Sydney's outer southern suburbs, including Heathcote and Bundeena. The division covers areas east of the Illawarra escarpment and is bounded by the Tasman Sea to the east. It is bounded to the north by the Royal National Park and to the south by the Wollongong suburbs of Figtree, Cordeaux Heights and Coniston. Although the region is primarily rural, the vast majority of the population is located in the northern outskirts of Wollongong and along the eastern seaboard. The main products and means of livelihood in the area are tourism, tertiary education, steel production, coal mining, brick manufacturing, textiles and dairy farming.

Members

Election results

References

External links
 Division of Cunningham - Australian Electoral Commission
 

Electoral divisions of Australia
Constituencies established in 1949
1949 establishments in Australia